Atomic electron transition is a change (or jump) of an electron from one energy level to another within an atom or artificial atom. It appears discontinuous as the electron "jumps" from one quantized energy level to another, typically in a few nanoseconds or less. It is also known as an electronic (de-)excitation or atomic transition or quantum jump.

Electron transitions cause the emission or absorption of electromagnetic radiation in the form of quantized units called photons. Their statistics are Poissonian, and the time between jumps is exponentially distributed. The damping time constant (which ranges from nanoseconds to a few seconds) relates to the natural, pressure, and field broadening of spectral lines. The larger the energy separation of the states between which the electron jumps, the shorter the wavelength of the photon emitted. The emitted photon changes the kinetic energy of the atom, enabling the laser cooling technology to slow down the motion of atoms.

History 
Danish physicist Niels Bohr first theorized that electrons can perform quantum jumps in 1913. Soon after, James Franck and Gustav Ludwig Hertz proved experimentally that atoms have quantized energy states.

The observability of quantum jumps was predicted by Hans Dehmelt in 1975, and they were first observed using trapped ions of barium at University of Hamburg and mercury at NIST in 1986.

Recent discoveries 
In 2019, it was demonstrated in an experiment with a superconducting artificial atom consisting of two strongly-hybridized transmon qubits placed inside a readout resonator cavity at 15 mK, that the evolution of some jumps is continuous, coherent, deterministic, and reversible. On the other hand, other quantum jumps are inherently unpredictable.

See also

 Burst noise
 Ensemble interpretation
 Fluorescence
 Glowing pickle demonstration
 Molecular electronic transition, for molecules
 Phosphorescence
 Quantum jump
 Spontaneous emission
 Stimulated emission

References

External links 

   Part 2
 "There are no quantum jumps, nor are there particles!" by H. D. Zeh, Physics Letters A172, 189 (1993).
 
"Surface plasmon at a metal-dielectric interface with an epsilon-near-zero transition layer" by Kevin Roccapriore et al., Physical Review B 103, L161404 (2021).

Atomic physics
Electron states